is a passenger railway station in the city of Funabashi, Chiba, Japan, operated by the third sector railway operator Tōyō Rapid Railway.

Lines
Higashi-Kaijin Station is a station on the Tōyō Rapid Railway Line, and is 2.1 km from the starting point of the line at Nishi-Funabashi Station.

Station layout 
The station is an underground station with a single island platform located on the second story underground. The ticket gates are located on the first story underground.

Platforms

History
Higashi-Kaijin Station was opened on April 27, 1996.

Passenger statistics
In fiscal 2018, the station was used by an average of 4,273 passengers daily.

Surrounding area
Funabashi City Hinodai Historical Park Museum (adjacent to Kaijin Junior High School)
Funabashi City Kaijin Junior High School (northwest side of the station)
Funabashi City Funabashi Junior High School
Funabashi City Kaijin Elementary School (south side of the station)
Shin-Funabashi Station

See also
 List of railway stations in Japan

References

External links

 Tōyō Rapid Railway Station information 

Railway stations in Japan opened in 1996
Railway stations in Chiba Prefecture
Funabashi